"California" is a pop song written by Rick Nowels, Billy Steinberg and Maria Vidal, produced by David Tickle for Belinda Carlisle's sixth studio album, A Woman and a Man (1996). It was released as the album's fourth single in the UK and the third single in Australia as a CD single.

Critical reception
British magazine Music Week rated the song three out of five, adding, "This cool, smooth ditty is quite a grower, although the production seems a little too stark."

Music video
The accompanying music video for "California" was directed by Philippe Gautier.

Track listing
 Australian CD single
 "California"
 "In Too Deep" (acoustic)
 "Circle in the Sand" (acoustic)

 UK CD single 1
 "California"
 "Leave a Light On" (live)
 "Live Your Life Be Free" (live)
 "Heaven Is a Place on Earth" (live)

 UK CD single 2
 "California"
 "Big Scary Animal" (live)
 "I Get Weak" (live)
 "In Too Deep" (live)

Charts

Personnel

Produced and mixed by David Tickle
Guitar by Phil Grande
Bass by Nick Beggs
Drums by Steve Wren

Keyboards by Rory Kaplan
Percussion by Paulinho Da Costa
Background vocals by Brian Wilson

References

External links
Lyrics

1996 songs
1997 singles
Belinda Carlisle songs
Chrysalis Records singles
Songs about California
Songs written by Billy Steinberg
Songs written by Maria Vidal
Songs written by Rick Nowels